Kølig Kaj, born Thomas Lægaard Sørensen (born 15 August 1971, Pindstrup, Denmark) is a Danish rapper who gained national fame in 1997 by winning Dansk Melodi Grand Prix with his song "Stemmen i mit liv".

At the Eurovision Song Contest 1997, he placed 16th with 25 points.
"Kølig Kaj" literally means "Cool Kaj".

He released an album called Solgt Ud!. He also featured on the final track, Hvem Er Det Der Banker on the album called Så'n Er Vi by Danish Hip hop act Hvid Sjokolade, released in 1996. The track also credited to feature Klart Dér, Joker Jay, Humleridderne, Pervers, Isbjerg, Malk De Koijn, Jimmy & Dj Pladespiller.

Kølig Kaj has been one of the pioneers in increasing the popularity of Danish hip hop.

References

Living people
Danish male singers
Danish rappers
Danish hip hop musicians
Eurovision Song Contest entrants for Denmark
Eurovision Song Contest entrants of 1997
1971 births